10th Street Market, also known as the Swan's Market, Oakland Free Market or the Sanitary Free Market, was a commercial market district in Oakland, California. 10th Street Market was built in 1917 and expanded in 1926. It was named to the National Register of Historic Places on August 3, 2001.  It is now known as Swan's Marketplaces, a mixed-use commercial and residential area. In 2001 Swan's Marketplace was awarded the Rudy Bruner Award for Urban Excellence silver medal.

See also
Cosecha, a restaurant at Swan's Market

References

Commercial buildings on the National Register of Historic Places in California
Commercial buildings completed in 1917
National Register of Historic Places in Oakland, California